The Spasskaya Tower International Military Music Festival is an annual military music event and military tattoo held in Moscow on Red Square. Participating in the festival are Russian and foreign military bands, folk groups, and honor guard units of foreign countries. More than 40 countries have taken part in the festival since 2006. It is named after the world-famous Spasskaya Tower of the Moscow Kremlin. Its TV partner is TV Centre. The festival's motto is "To Revive Traditions and Preserve History".

In 2020, the directorate of the festival became a full-fledged member of the Asian Marching Band Confederation (AMBC).

Timeline

The following is a timeline of the festival's history:

 2007: It took place on Poklonnaya Hill and celebrated the Moscow City Day. The event was seen by more than 50,000 people.
 2008: The event was referred to as the International Military Music Festival "The Kremlin Zorya". The Foreign and Commonwealth Office banned British Army bagpipers from travelling to event in protest of the 2008 Russo-Georgian War. The move was criticized by Brigadier Melville Jameson of the Edinburgh Military Tattoo and Vitaly Mironov of the Kremlin Zorya Foundation, with both accusing Foreign Secretary David Miliband of "playing politics" in a cultural event.
 2014: 1,500 military musicians and honor guards from 10 countries took part in the festival. The theme of the festival marked the First World War centenary.
 2015: The festival celebrated the 70th anniversary of the end of the Second World War.
 2016: Attended by over a 1,000 musicians. Participating teams included those from Austria, Greece, the European Union, Italy, Mongolia, Singapore, Slovenia, Kazakhstan, Japan, Israel, Belarus, and Scotland. The tattoo began with a minute of silence for the 291 victims of the August 2016 Central Italy earthquake.
 2017: The tattoo celebrated the 10th anniversary of the founding of the festival. It also honoured Lieutenant General Valery Khalilov, the musical director of the festival who died along with the entire Alexandrov Ensemble in the 2016 Russian Defence Ministry Tupolev Tu-154 crash. Over a thousand musicians from 40 young bands of the Central Federal District took part in the festival as part of a larger Children's Combined Band. Distinguished guests of honor included Belarusian Defence Minister Andrey Ravkov and his spouse, Chief Conductor in the Abkhazian Defence Ministry David Terzyan and Director of Bands for the Egyptian Armed Forces Major General Helmi Ahmed Suliman Khatab.
 2018: The tattoo was attended by HRH Princess Stephanie of Monaco. The 2018 festival marked the 10th time that French singer Mireille Mathieu (who is also the festival's mascot) has appeared in the festival. It also marked the first time that military bands from the Commonwealth of Independent States (CIS) did not participate in the festival 
2019: Individuals such as Georgian born People's Artist and singer Tamara Gverdtsiteli., as well as others such as Hibla Gerzmava and Anita Tsoi were among the vocal performers in the festival.
2020: The theme for the 2020 festival was "75 years - the end of the war", in honor of the diamond jubilee of the defeat of Nazi Germany. It was expected that the festival for this year be one that tells about the history of the military music in Russia. The bands of the anti-Hitler coalition were also invited to the festival. Due to the COVID-19, foreign bands were not able to participate in the festival, and later, it was announced that the festival was cancelled altogether, marking the first time since its establishment that the public event on Red Square had been cancelled. Instead of the normal program, it was announced that an online festival would take place on 6 September on the Cathedral Square of the Main Cathedral of the Russian Armed Forces, with over 12 musical units from the armed forces and other organizations performing, including a few first time participants. Virtual greetings were given by the Royal Thai Navy Band,  the French Air Force Southwest Band, the Zürich City Police Band, and the PLA Band.
2021: The 2021 edition saw Till Lindemann of the German band Rammstein serve as headliner.

Bands in the Parks

The Bands in the Parks is a program sponsored by Directorate of the Spasskaya Tower International Military Music Festival and is carried out from May to August in support of the Ministry of Defense of Russia and the Government of Moscow. The first of these performances took place at VDNKh in 2016 and was greeted with a standing ovation by Muscovites and guests of the capital. In the anniversary year a year later, the program of performances was expanded. The number of concerts and city venues involved in the project has increased.

Performers

Foreign
Normally, each festival included a maximum of 12 countries, apart from Russia.

Other low-level participants have included the Republican Specialized Academic Lyceum of Music of the Uzbekistan National Guard and the National Presidential Band of Ukraine.

Russian performers

 Honour Guard and Cavalry Escort of the Kremlin Regiment (2007–Present)
 Presidential Band of the Russian Federation (2007–Present)
 Central Military Band of the Ministry of Defense of Russia (2007–Present)
 Central Navy Band of Russia (2007–Present)
 Band of the Moscow Military Music College (2007–Present)
 Band of the Dzerzhinsky Division (2009, 2010, 2011, 2012, 2013, 2015, 2016, 2017, 2018, 2019)
 Special Exemplary Military Band of the Guard of Honor Battalion of Russia (2011–Present)
 Band of the 154th Preobrazhensky Regiment (2012–Present)
 Girls Corps of Drums, Boarding School for Girls, Ministry of Defense of Russia (2012-2018)
 Central Band of the Border Guard Service of the Federal Security Service of Russia (2018)
 Military Band of the Southern Military District (2019)
 Combined Band and Song and Dance Company of the Russian Airborne Forces (2020)
 Military Band of the Krasnodar Region Main Department of the National Guard (2020)
 Band of the S.M. Kirov Military Medical Academy
 Central Exemplary Band of the Ministry of Emergency Situations of Russia (2020)
 Band of GBOU School No. 1770, Moscow (2020)

Notable guests

Svetlana Medvedeva, 3rd First Lady of Russia
Army General Valery Gerasimov, Chief of the General Staff
General Vladimir Kolokoltsev, Minister of Internal Affairs
Belarusian Defence Minister Andrei Ravkov and his wife Natalia
Princess Stéphanie of Monaco
Lieutenant Colonel Abdul Wahab Khan, Pakistan Army School of Music
Hamad bin Isa al-Khalifa, King of Bahrain
Lieutenant General Christos Vaitsis, Chief of the Hellenic Air Force General Staff

Protocol

The President of Russia in his/her position as Supreme Commander-in-Chief of the Russian Armed Forces usually delivers a message of congratulations to the organizers and participants of the festival. Greetings are also given by the Russian Defence Minister and the Mayor of Moscow. The day before the festival's opening ceremony, the directors of the participating bands lay wreaths at the Tomb of the Unknown Soldier in Alexander Garden. The festival usually coincides with Moscow's City Day, which means that some of the participating bands take part in the procession along Tverskaya Street.

Directors
The musical director of the festival is the senior director of music of the Military Band Service of the Armed Forces of Russia.
 Lieutenant General Valery Khalilov (2006–2016)
 Major General Timofey Mayakin (2016–Present)

Roman Markholia served as producer-director of the festival in 2010, 2011 and 2012.

Award winners

Public Council
The public council is the organizing committee of the festival.

Gallery

External links 

 Official Website 
 Official Website 
 Official Youtube Channel

Videos 
 9th Spasskaya Tower Military Music Festival
 10th Spasskaya Tower Military Music Festival
 12th Spasskaya Tower Military Music Festival
 13th Spasskaya Tower Military Music Festival
 14th Spasskaya Tower Military Music Festival
 Russia: Spasskaya Tower Military Music Festival rehearsals take place on Red Square
 Военные оркестры в парках 2019 (Парк Фили)
 Russia: Final rehearsals for 11th Spasskaya Tower Military Music Festival get underway
 Band of the Azerbaijan Higher Military School

References 

Military music
Red Square
Events in Moscow
Festivals established in 2006
Music festivals established in 2006
2006 establishments in Russia
Annual events in Russia
Military of Russia
Festivals in Moscow
Music festivals in Russia
Military tattoos